Yothin FA Group (โยธิน เอฟ.เอ.กรุ๊ป) is a Thai Muay Thai fighter.

Biography and career

Yohtin started fighting at 5 years old and was training at Sakaethongresort gym in the Isan region until he was scouted by FA Group gym.

Yothin tries to walk in the steps of a knee fighter from the same gym Petchboonchu FA Group under the same teacher Kru Diesel.

From March 2016 to march 2017 Yothin had 8 victories and only 1 defeat which led him to be on the shortlist for the Thailand Sports Writers Fighter of the Year Award.

Yothin went on an extended winning streak in the Rajadamnern Stadium and was ranked #1 but was not rewarded by a title shot.

Titles and accomplishments
World Muay Thai Council
 2016 WMC World 118 lbs Champion
True4U Muaymanwansuk
 2016 True4U 118 lbs Champion
Professional Boxing Association of Thailand (PAT) 
 2021 Thailand 126 lbs Champion
International Federation of Muaythai Associations
 2022 IFMA World Championships -57kg 
Rajadamnern Stadium
 2022 Rajadamnern World Series 126 lbs Winner

Fight record

|- style="background:#cfc" 
| 2022-12-16 || Win ||align="left" | Petchrungruang Sor.Jor.Tongprajin || Rajadamnern World Series - Final || Bangkok, Thailand || Decision (Unanimous) || 5 ||3:00
|-
! style=background:white colspan=9 |
|- style="background:#cfc" 
| 2022-11-11 || Win ||align="left" | Ayad Albadr || Rajadamnern World Series - Semi Final || Bangkok, Thailand || Decision (Unanimous) ||3  ||3:00
|- style="background:#cfc" 
| 2022-10-07 || Win ||align="left" | Petchrungruang Sor.Jor.Tongprajin || Rajadamnern World Series - Group Stage  || Bangkok, Thailand || Decision (Unanimous)|| 3 ||3:00
|- style="background:#cfc" 
| 2022-09-02 ||  Win||align="left" | John Shink || Rajadamnern World Series - Group Stage || Bangkok, Thailand ||Decision (Unanimous) || 3 || 3:00  
|-  style="background:#cfc;"
| 2022-07-29 || Win ||align=left| Ayad Albadr || Rajadamnern World Series - Group Stage|| Bangkok, Thailand || Decision (Unanimous) || 3 || 3:00  
|-  style="background:#fbb;"
| 2022-06-20 || Loss ||align=left| Ronachai Tor.Ramintra  || U-Muay RuamJaiKonRakMuayThai + Palangmai, Rajadamnern Stadium || Bangkok, Thailand || Decision || 5 || 3:00 
|-  style="background:#cfc;"
| 2022-05-04|| Win||align=left| Samingdam Chor.Ajalaboon ||Muay Thai Palangmai, Rajadamnern Stadium ||Bangkok, Thailand || Decision || 5 ||3:00 
|-  style="background:#fbb;"
| 2022-02-26|| Loss||align=left| Sherzod VenumMCamp || Muay Thai Fighter X ||Hua Hin, Thailand || Decision  || 5 || 3:00  
|-  style="background:#fbb;"
| 2022-01-08|| Loss||align=left| Samingdam Chor.Ajalaboon || Suk Jao Muay Thai, Siam Omnoi Stadium ||Samut Sakhon, Thailand || Decision (Unanimous) || 5 || 3:00  
|-
! style=background:white colspan=9 |
|-  style="background:#cfc;"
| 2021-11-20|| Win ||align=left| Chailar Por.Lakboon || Suk Jao Muay Thai, Siam Omnoi Stadium ||Samut Sakhon, Thailand || Decision || 5 || 3:00 
|-
! style=background:white colspan=9 |
|-  style="background:#cfc;"
| 2021-10-10|| Win ||align=left| Nawaek Sitchefboontham || Suk Jao Muay Thai, Siam Omnoi Stadium ||Samut Sakhon, Thailand || Decision  || 5 || 3:00
|-  style="background:#c5d2ea;"
| 2020-11-14|| Draw ||align=left| Felype Morais || Muay Hardcore||Bangkok, Thailand || Decision  || 3 || 3:00
|-  style="background:#cfc;"
| 2020-09-04|| Win||align=left| Pompetch SorSor.Toipadriew || True4U Muaymanwansuk, Rangsit Stadium || Rangsit, Thailand || Decision || 5|| 3:00
|-  style="background:#fbb;"
| 2020-07-24 || Loss||align=left| Tongnoi Lukbanyai || True4U Muaymanwansuk, Rangsit Stadium || Rangsit, Thailand || Decision || 5|| 3:00
|-  style="background:#CCFFCC;"
| 2020-02-09|| Win ||align=left| Petchsuntri Jitmuangnon ||  Rajadamnern Stadium ||Bangkok, Thailand || Decision  || 5 || 3:00
|-  style="background:#FFBBBB;"
| 2019-11-21 || Loss||align=left|  Samingdet Nor.Anuwatgym || Rajadamnern Stadium || Bangkok, Thailand || Decision || 5 || 3:00
|-  style="background:#CCFFCC;"
| 2019-10-03|| Win ||align=left| Samingdet Nor.Anuwatgym ||  Rajadamnern Stadium ||Bangkok, Thailand || Decision  || 5 || 3:00
|-  style="background:#c5d2ea;"
| 2019-08-09|| Draw ||align=left| Samingdet Nor.Anuwatgym || Petchyindee True4U Lumpinee Stadium ||Bangkok, Thailand || Decision  || 5 || 3:00
|-
! style=background:white colspan=9 |
|-  style="background:#CCFFCC;"
| 2019-07-05|| Win ||align=left| Rungnarai Kiatmuu9 || Muaymanwansuk + Petchpiya Lumpinee Stadium ||Bangkok, Thailand || KO (Right elbow)  || 3 ||
|-  style="background:#FFBBBB;"
| 2019-05-09|| Loss ||align=left| Kompatak SinbiMuayThai || Rajadamnern Stadium || Bangkok, Thailand || Decision  || 5 || 3:00
|-  style="background:#CCFFCC;"
| 2019-03-21|| Win ||align=left| Detchaiya PetchyindeeAcademy || Rajadamnern Stadium || Bangkok, Thailand || Decision  || 5 || 3:00
|-  style="background:#FFBBBB;"
| 2019-02-01|| Loss ||align=left| Kompatak SinbiMuayThai || Lumpinee Stadium || Bangkok, Thailand || Decision  || 5 || 3:00
|-  style="background:#CCFFCC;"
| 2018-11-22|| Win ||align=left| Somraknoi Muayded789 || Rajadamnern Stadium || Bangkok, Thailand || Decision  || 5 || 3:00
|-  style="background:#FFBBBB;"
| 2018-11-01|| Loss ||align=left| Kiewpayak Jitmuangnon || Rajadamnern Stadium || Bangkok, Thailand || Decision  || 5 || 3:00
|-  style="background:#CCFFCC;"
| 2018-09-10|| Win ||align=left| Saksit Tor.Paopiemsabpedrew || Rajadamnern Stadium || Bangkok, Thailand || Decision  || 5 || 3:00
|-  style="background:#CCFFCC;"
| 2018-07-26|| Win ||align=left| Puenkon Tor.Surat || Rajadamnern Stadium || Bangkok, Thailand || Decision  || 5 || 3:00
|-  style="background:#CCFFCC;"
| 2018-05-26|| Win ||align=left| Petch Cho Hae || Topking World Series || Bangkok, Thailand || KO || 2 ||
|-  style="background:#FFBBBB;"
| 2018-04-09|| Loss ||align=left| Kiewpayak Jitmuangnon || Rajadamnern Stadium || Bangkok, Thailand || Decision  || 5 || 3:00
|-  style="background:#CCFFCC;"
| 2018-03-07|| Win ||align=left| Palangpon PetchyindeeAcademy || Rajadamnern Stadium || Bangkok, Thailand || Decision  || 5 || 3:00
|-  style="background:#CCFFCC;"
| 2018-02-08|| Win ||align=left| Phetrung Sitnayokkaipadriew || Rajadamnern Stadium || Bangkok, Thailand || Decision  || 5 || 3:00
|-  style="background:#CCFFCC;"
| 2017-11-09|| Win ||align=left| Saknarinnoi Aor Auansuwan || Rajadamnern Stadium || Bangkok, Thailand || Decision  || 5 || 3:00
|-  style="background:#CCFFCC;"
| 2017-09-04|| Win ||align=left| Kriangkrai PetchyindeeAcademy || Rajadamnern Stadium || Bangkok, Thailand || Decision  || 5 || 3:00
|-  style="background:#CCFFCC;"
| 2017-07-06|| Win ||align=left| Somraknoi Muayded789 || Rajadamnern Stadium || Bangkok, Thailand || Decision  || 5 || 3:00
|-  style="background:#FFBBBB;"
| 2017-06-05|| Loss ||align=left| Somraknoi Muayded789 || Rajadamnern Stadium || Bangkok, Thailand || Decision  || 5 || 3:00
|-  style="background:#FFBBBB;"
| 2017-05-04|| Loss ||align=left| Kiewpayak Jitmuangnon || Rajadamnern Stadium || Bangkok, Thailand || Decision  || 5 || 3:00
|-  style="background:#CCFFCC;"
| 2017-04-06|| Win ||align=left| Kengkaj Por.Pekko || Rajadamnern Stadium || Bangkok, Thailand || Decision  || 5 || 3:00
|-  style="background:#CCFFCC;"
| 2017-03-15|| Win ||align=left| Kiewpayak Jitmuangnon || Rajadamnern Stadium || Bangkok, Thailand || Decision  || 5 || 3:00
|-  style="background:#CCFFCC;"
| 2017-02-07|| Win ||align=left| Kiewpayak Jitmuangnon || Lumpinee Stadium || Bangkok, Thailand || Decision  || 5 || 3:00
|-  style="background:#CCFFCC;"
| 2016-12-23|| Win ||align=left| Kumandoi Petcharoenvit || Rangsit Boxing Stadium || Rangsit, Thailand || Decision  || 5 || 3:00
|-
! style=background:white colspan=9 |
|-  style="background:#CCFFCC;"
| 2016-11-14|| Win  ||align=left| Achanai PetchyindeeAcademy || Rajadamnern Stadium ||Bangkok, Thailand || Decision  || 5 || 3:00
|-  style="background:#CCFFCC;"
| 2016-09-30|| Win ||align=left| Wanchalong PK.Saenchai || Lumpinee Stadium ||Bangkok, Thailand || Decision  || 5 || 3:00
|-  style="background:#CCFFCC;"
| 2016-09-05|| Win ||align=left| Kompatak SinbiMuayThai || Rajadamnern Stadium ||Bangkok, Thailand || Decision  || 5 || 3:00
|-
! style=background:white colspan=9 |
|-  style="background:#CCFFCC;"
| 2016-08-08|| Win ||align=left| Jomhod Eminentair || Rajadamnern Stadium ||Bangkok, Thailand || Decision  || 5 || 3:00
|-  style="background:#CCFFCC;"
| 2016-07-06|| Win ||align=left| Yokmorakot Wor.Sungprapai || Rajadamnern Stadium ||Bangkok, Thailand || Decision  || 5 || 3:00
|-  style="background:#FFBBBB;"
| 2016-05-09|| Loss ||align=left| Achanai PetchyindeeAcademy || Rajadamnern Stadium || Bangkok, Thailand || Decision  || 5 || 3:00
|-  style="background:#CCFFCC;"
| 2016-04-07|| Win ||align=left| Palangpon PetchyindeeAcademy || Rajadamnern Stadium ||Bangkok, Thailand || Decision  || 5 || 3:00
|-  style="background:#FFBBBB;"
| 2016-03-05|| Loss ||align=left| Kompatak SinbiMuayThai || Rangsit Boxing Stadium || Rangsit, Thailand || KO || 4 ||
|-  style="background:#FFBBBB;"
| 2016-01-30|| Loss ||align=left| Kongthoranee Sor.Boongium ||  || Thailand || KO || 2 ||
|-  style="background:#CCFFCC;"
| 2015-11-26|| Win ||align=left| Phetprab Mahanakhonortogrup || Rajadamnern Stadium || Bangkok, Thailand || KO || 4 ||
|-  style="background:#CCFFCC;"
| 2015-11-02|| Win ||align=left| Achanai PetchyindeeAcademy || Rajadamnern Stadium || Bangkok, Thailand || Decision  || 5 || 3:00
|-  style="background:#FFBBBB;"
| 2015-10-07|| Loss ||align=left| Achanai PetchyindeeAcademy || Rajadamnern Stadium || Bangkok, Thailand || Decision  || 5 || 3:00
|-  style="background:#FFBBBB;"
| 2015-09-15|| Loss ||align=left| Morakot Petchsimuen || Lumpinee Stadium || Bangkok, Thailand || Decision  || 5 || 3:00
|-  style="background:#CCFFCC;"
| 2015-08-11|| Win ||align=left| Palangpon PetchyindeeAcademy || Lumpinee Stadium ||Bangkok, Thailand || Decision  || 5 || 3:00
|-  style="background:#CCFFCC;"
| 2015-07-20|| Win ||align=left| Wanchai Kiatmuu9 ||  || Thailand || Decision  || 5 || 3:00
|-  style="background:#FFBBBB;"
| 2015-06-11|| Loss ||align=left| Morakot Petchsimuen || Rajadamnern Stadium || Bangkok, Thailand || Decision  || 5 || 3:00
|-  style="background:#FFBBBB;"
| 2015-05-13|| Loss ||align=left| Morakot Petchsimuen || Rajadamnern Stadium || Bangkok, Thailand || Decision  || 5 || 3:00
|-  style="background:#CCFFCC;"
| 2015-04-08|| Win ||align=left| Fahmai Sor.Sommmai || Rajadamnern Stadium || Bangkok, Thailand || Decision  || 5 || 3:00
|-  style="background:#CCFFCC;"
| 2015-03-01|| Win ||align=left| Kunhan Chor.Hapayak || Rangsit Boxing Stadium || Rangsit, Thailand || Decision  || 5 || 3:00
|-  style="background:#CCFFCC;"
| 2015-02-06|| Win ||align=left| Phetwason Or.Daokrajai || Lumpinee Stadium ||Bangkok, Thailand || Decision  || 5 || 3:00
|-  style="background:#FFBBBB;"
| 2014-12-22|| Loss ||align=left| Morakot Petchsimuen || Rajadamnern Stadium ||Bangkok, Thailand || Decision  || 5 || 3:00
|-  style="background:#FFBBBB;"
| 2014-09-10|| Loss ||align=left| Fasitong Sor.Jor.Piek-U-Thai || Rajadamnern Stadium ||Bangkok, Thailand || Decision  || 5 || 3:00
|-  style="background:#CCFFCC;"
| 2014-07-07|| Win ||align=left| Ole Sitniwat || Lumpinee Stadium ||Bangkok, Thailand || Decision  || 5 || 3:00
|-  style="background:#FFBBBB;"
| 2013-04-05|| Loss||align=left| Panpayak Jitmuangnon || Lumpinee Stadium || Bangkok, Thailand || KO || 2 ||
|-  style="background:#FFBBBB;"
| 2013-03-05|| Loss||align=left| Pragaipet Sagami || Lumpinee Stadium || Bangkok, Thailand || Decision  || 5 || 3:00
|-  style="background:#CCFFCC;"
| 2013-01-15|| Win ||align=left| Sarawut Pitakparpadaeng || Lumpinee Stadium ||Bangkok, Thailand || Decision  || 5 || 3:00
|-  style="background:#CCFFCC;"
| 2012-12-14|| Win ||align=left| Apisit Fonjangchonburi  || Lumpinee Stadium ||Bangkok, Thailand || Decision  || 5 || 3:00 
|-
| colspan=9 | Legend:    

|-  style="background:#fbb;"
| 2022-06-02|| Loss ||align=left| Daren Rolland || IFMA Senior World Championships 2022, Semi Finals|| Abu Dhabi, United Arab Emirates || Decision (Unanimous) || 3 ||3:00 
|-
! style=background:white colspan=9 |

|-  style="background:#cfc;"
| 2022-05-31|| Win ||align=left| Anakkayi Fahad || IFMA Senior World Championships 2022, Quarter Finals|| Abu Dhabi, United Arab Emirates || TKO (Body shots) || 1 || 

|-  style="background:#cfc;"
| 2022-05-29||Win||align=left| Saadi Abdellah || IFMA Senior World Championships 2022, Second Round|| Abu Dhabi, United Arab Emirates || Decision (Unanimous) || 3 ||3:00 

|-
| colspan=9 | Legend:

References

Yothin FA Group
Living people
1992 births